The railway from Amsterdam through Haarlem to Rotterdam (also: Oude Lijn, Dutch for "old line")  runs from Amsterdam Centraal to Rotterdam Centraal through Haarlem (and The Hague).

From December 2011 it is used by all direct trains from Amsterdam to The Hague, and all direct supplement-free trains from Amsterdam to Rotterdam except those through Woerden.

History
It contains the oldest railway line in the Netherlands, and follows the old horse-drawn boat (Dutch: trekschuit) canal route from Leiden via Haarlem to Amsterdam-Sloterdijk. It was opened between 1839 and 1847 by the Hollandsche IJzeren Spoorweg-Maatschappij. The oldest section, opened in 1839, led from Amsterdam to Haarlem. Leiden and The Hague were reached in 1843, and the final section from The Hague to Rotterdam was opened in June 1847.

The opening of the Weesp–Leiden railway (1978) and the Amsterdam–Schiphol railway (1986) provided a shorter connection from Leiden through Schiphol Airport to Amsterdam. Nevertheless, the old line via Haarlem has remained an important railway line.

In March 2015 a new tunnel and station were opened in Delft, underpassing the former railway station and viaduct. Currently the doubling of the tracks is underway, after a long delay.

References

External links 
 Nederlands Spoorwegmuseum

Railway lines in the Netherlands
Railway lines opened in 1847
1847 establishments in the Netherlands
Railway lines in North Holland
Railway lines in South Holland
Standard gauge railways in the Netherlands
Rail transport in Amsterdam
Rail transport in Rotterdam
19th-century architecture in the Netherlands